The Sagebrush Family Trails West is a 1940 American Western film directed by Sam Newfield and written by Fred Myton. The film stars Bobby Clack, Earle Hodgins, Nina Guilbert, Joyce Bryant, Minerva Urecal and Arch Hall Sr. The film was released on January 17, 1940, by Producers Distributing Corporation.

Plot

Cast          
Bobby Clack as Bobby Sawyer (credited as Bobby Clark)
Earle Hodgins as 'Doc' Sawyer
Nina Guilbert as Minerva Sawyer
Joyce Bryant as Nellie Sawyer
Minerva Urecal as Widow Gail
Arch Hall Sr. as Jim Barton 
Kenne Duncan as Bart Wallace
Forrest Taylor as Len Gorman
Carl Mathews as Zeke
Wally West as Hank
Byron Vance as Seth
Augie Gomez as Bart

References

External links

1940 films
American Western (genre) films
1940 Western (genre) films
Films directed by Sam Newfield
American black-and-white films
1940s English-language films
1940s American films